Simon John Plumley Fisher is a British Anglican priest currently serving as Archdeacon of St Helens and Warrington.

Previously vicar of St John the Baptist, Tuebrook, Liverpool, Fisher was announced as Archdeacon-designate in October 2019, and collated on 25 January 2020.

References

Living people
Year of birth missing (living people)
Archdeacons of Liverpool
21st-century English Anglican priests